Monika Kallies (later Leschhorn; born 31 July 1956) is a German rower

Kallies was born in 1956 in Stralsund and was a member of SC Dynamo Potsdam / Sportvereinigung (SV) Dynamo. At the 1975 World Rowing Championships in Nottingham she won a gold medal with the women's eight. She won a gold medal at the 1976 Summer Olympics with the women's eight.

References

1956 births
Living people
People from Stralsund
People from Bezirk Rostock
East German female rowers
Sportspeople from Mecklenburg-Western Pomerania
Olympic rowers of East Germany
Rowers at the 1976 Summer Olympics
Olympic gold medalists for East Germany
Olympic medalists in rowing
Medalists at the 1976 Summer Olympics
World Rowing Championships medalists for East Germany
Recipients of the Patriotic Order of Merit in silver